In the early morning hours of November 15, 1959, four members of the Clutter family  Herb Clutter, his wife Bonnie, and their teenage children Nancy and Kenyon  were murdered in their rural home, just outside the small farming community of Holcomb, Kansas. Two ex-convicts, Perry Smith and Richard Hickock, were found guilty of the murders and sentenced to death. Smith and Hickock were executed by the state of Kansas on the same day, April 14, 1965. The murders were detailed by Truman Capote in his 1966 non-fiction novel In Cold Blood.

Background 

Herbert "Herb" Clutter was a prosperous farmer in western Kansas. His two elder daughters, Eveanna and Beverly, had moved out and started their adult lives. His two younger children, Nancy (age 16) and Kenyon (age 15), were high school students. Clutter's wife Bonnie had reportedly been incapacitated by clinical depression and physical ailments since the births of her children, although this was later disputed. Both Nancy and Kenyon Clutter attended Holcomb High School.

Richard "Dick" Hickock and Perry Smith were two ex-convicts, recently paroled from the Kansas State Penitentiary. Floyd Wells, a former cellmate of Hickock's, had been a farmhand for Herb Clutter. Wells told Hickock that Clutter kept large amounts of cash in a safe. However, Clutter did not have a safe and transacted all of his business by check. After speaking with Wells, Hickock soon hatched the idea to steal the safe and start a new life in Mexico. Hickock later contacted Smith, another former cellmate, about committing the robbery with him. According to Truman Capote, the author of In Cold Blooda non-fiction novel detailing the Clutter family murders  Hickock described his plan as "a cinch, the perfect score".

Murders 
In the early morning hours of November 15, the pair arrived in Holcomb, located the Clutter home, and entered through an unlocked door while the family slept. Upon rousing the Clutters, they pushed Bonnie, Nancy, and Kenyon into a bathroom on the second floor of the house, then led Herb to his first-floor office. After a search, during which they began to realize there was no safe, they retrieved the other three members of the family from the bathroom. Bonnie's hands were tied in front of her; she was gagged, then tucked into bed in a room on the second floor. Nancy's hands were tied behind her - inexplicably, she was not gagged - then she, too, was tucked into bed. Then, Kenyon and Herb were taken to the basement; first, Kenyon was gagged and his hands were tied behind him, then the rope was tied to an overhead steam pipe in the furnace room. Thinking better of this, the killers cut him free, then moved him to the adjoining playroom. Bound and gagged, lying at an oblique angle on the small couch, a white pillow was stuffed behind his head, presumably to make him more comfortable. Finally, Herb was bound and gagged, then pushed down onto a mattress box lying on the concrete floor in the furnace room. Smith stayed in the furnace room, while Hickock returned upstairs to resume his search for the safe.

A short time later, Hickock returned to the basement, disappointed and angry, having found no safe. The pair had already planned to leave no witnesses, and they briefly debated what to do. Finally, Smith - known to occasionally be unstable, prone to fits of rage - slit Herb Clutter's throat, then shot him in the head. Moments after Herb was killed, Smith and Hickock reentered the playroom, where Smith shot Kenyon to death. Heading upstairs, then to the second floor, the pair entered Nancy's room, and she was shot to death. Lastly, Bonnie Clutter was killed by a gunshot wound to the side of the head. Each of the four victims had been killed by a single shotgun blast to the head, though Herb's throat was cut as well, and each spent shell was retrieved by the killers. Recounting later the sequence of events that night, Smith claimed to have dissuaded Hickock from raping Nancy.

Having killed all four members of the family, Hickock and Smith fled the crime scene, taking with them a Zenith portable radio belonging to Kenyon Clutter, a pair of binoculars belonging to Herb Clutter and less than $50 in cash (approximately $480 in 2022) presumed to have been left over from a $60 check Herb Clutter had cashed the day before. It was generally known in the area that Herb preferred paying by check, and he seldom carried on his person, nor kept in the house, significant amounts of cash. His billfold and several items were found scattered about in his first-floor bedroom, but no cash was found there.

Smith later claimed in his oral confession that Hickock had murdered Nancy and Bonnie. When asked to sign his confession, however, Smith refused. According to Capote's In Cold Blood, Smith wanted to accept responsibility for all four killings because, he said, he felt "sorry for Dick's mother". Smith added, "She's a real sweet person". Hickock always maintained that Smith had murdered all four victims.

Victims 

The four victims:

 Herbert William "Herb" Clutter (May 24, 1911  November 15, 1959), age 48.
 Bonnie Mae Fox Clutter (January 7, 1914  November 15, 1959), age 45, Herb's wife.
 Nancy Mae Clutter (January 2, 1943  November 15, 1959) was the 16-year-old daughter of Herb and Bonnie Clutter. She was the third eldest of the four Clutter children, and youngest of the three daughters. Nancy had been a straight "A" student, a junior at Holcomb High School, and she played the clarinet in the high school band. Well-liked, outgoing, and pretty, she attended church regularly and was active in 4-H. Nancy enjoyed horseback riding, baking, needlepoint, music, and sewing, and she was often sought out by younger girls, who wanted her help with domestic skills such as cooking and baking, or with their music lessons. 
 Kenyon Neal Clutter (August 28, 1944  November 15, 1959), age 15, a sophomore in high school, was the youngest of the four children; Herb and Bonnie's only son. Quiet, bespectacled, and somewhat shy, Kenyon's interests included hunting, woodworking, and working on an old pickup truck his father had allowed him to buy, despite the fact that he was not yet old enough to obtain a driver's license. He, like Nancy, was active in the local 4-H club. According to the murderers themselves, Kenyon had been killed by Perry Smith.

Approximately 1,000 mourners attended the Clutter family funeral, packing the First Methodist Church in Garden City, Kansas, county seat of Finney County, seven miles east of Holcomb. A majority of that crowd were also present at the burial at Valley View Cemetery, on the north edge of Garden City. The parents' graves are in the center, marked by a double headstone. Nancy's grave and single headstone is just to the left; those of Kenyon are just to the right.

Perpetrators 

The two perpetrators:

 Perry Edward Smith (October 27, 1928  April 14, 1965), age 31 at the time of the murders; age 36 at execution
 Richard Eugene "Dick" Hickock (June 6, 1931  April 14, 1965), age 28 at the time of the murders; age 33 at execution

Smith and Hickock were arrested in Las Vegas, Nevada, on December 30, some six weeks after the murders, after a dogged investigation by members of the Kansas Bureau of Investigation. After being extradited back to Kansas, their trial was held at the Finney County Courthouse in Garden City. Both Smith and Hickock were found guilty of four counts of first-degree murder, and they were sentenced to death. 

On April 14, 1965, they both were hanged at the Kansas State Prison near Lansing, just north of Kansas City.  Hickock was executed first and was pronounced dead at 12:41 am; Smith followed shortly afterward and was pronounced dead at 1:19 am.

In Cold Blood 

Before the killers were captured, author Truman Capote learned of the Clutter family murders and decided to travel to Kansas and write about the crime. He was accompanied by his childhood friend and fellow author, Harper Lee. Together, they interviewed local residents and investigators assigned to the case and took thousands of pages of notes. The killers, Hickock and Smith, were arrested six weeks after the murders and were eventually executed by the state of Kansas in 1965. Capote ultimately spent six years working on his book. When finally published in 1966, In Cold Blood was an instant success. Today, it is the second-best-selling true crime book in publishing history, behind Vincent Bugliosi's 1974 book Helter Skelter, about the Charles Manson murders.

Film and television 

 In Cold Blood (1967 film)  Robert Blake, portrayed Smith; Scott Wilson portrayed Hickock.
 In Cold Blood (1996 TV miniseries)  Eric Roberts portrayed Smith; Anthony Edwards portrayed Hickock.
 Capote (2005 film)  Clifton Collins Jr. portrayed Smith; Mark Pellegrino portrayed Hickock; Philip Seymour Hoffman portrayed Truman Capote. For his performance, Hoffman won the Academy Award for Best Actor. 
 Infamous (2006 film)  Daniel Craig portrayed Smith; Lee Pace portrayed Hickock; Toby Jones portrayed Capote; Sandra Bullock portrayed Lee.
 Once Upon a Crime, Season 5 Episode 1 of  A Crime to Remember (2013-2018 documentary series)  The series tells the stories of notorious crimes by switching between dramatization and interviews with crime experts and/or people involved in the crimes.

See also 

 Capital punishment in Kansas
 List of people executed in Kansas

References

External links 

 CrimeArchives: The Murders of the Clutter Family
 In Cold Blood Family Breaks Their Silence: Why They're Speaking Out Now About Infamous Slayings
 Clutter family murders - Garden City (Kansas) Police Department
 

1959 murders in the United States
Crime in Kansas
Family murders
Mass murder in 1959
Mass murder in the United States
Murder in Kansas
November 1959 events in the United States
People murdered in Kansas
Violent crime